Kalshi Islamia High School is a primary and secondary school at Mirpur in Dhaka, Bangladesh.  It was established in 1982. It is also known as Kalshi Islamia Uccha Biddalay and to local people it is also known as Kalshi School.

The school has about 60 teachers and staff and 1,200 students. It has both girl and boy students. Students from this institution appears for P.E.C (also known as P.S.C) Junior School Certificate (J.S.C.) and S.S.C public examinations. Primary and secondary school academic subjects are assigned by Dhaka Education Board.

References

High schools in Bangladesh
Educational institutions established in 1982
1982 establishments in Bangladesh
Schools in Dhaka District